Acrophyseter is a genus of extinct sperm whales that lived in the Late Miocene off the coast of Peru comprising two species: A. deinodon and A. robustus. It is part of a group of macroraptorial sperm whales which all shared several features for the purpose of hunting large prey, such as deeply-rooted and thick teeth. Acrophyseter measured , making it the smallest raptorial sperm whale. Because of its short pointed snout, and its strong curved front teeth, it probably fed on the large marine vertebrates of its time, such as seals and other whales.

Discovery
The genus Acrophyseter houses two species. The type species, A. deinodon, was discovered in the Sud-Sacaco locality of the Pisco Formation in Peru, dating back to the Tortonian–Messinian stages of the Miocene around 8.5–6.7 million years ago (mya); the holotype specimen, MNHN SAS 1626, represents a mature individual and consists of a skull and jaw with most of the teeth intact. The second species, A. robustus, is known from a skull also from the Pisco Formation in the Cerro la Bruja locality, named MUSM 2182, dating back to the Serravallian–Tortonian stages of the Miocene, older than at least 9.2 mya. A second A. deinodon specimen of a right parietal bone from the Aguada de Lomas locality was named MNHM F-PPI 272 and dated to the Messinian 6.9–6.7 mya, though it is possible it actually represents A. robustus. MUSM 1399 of a skull with the front half of the snout missing from the Cerro La Bruja locality was referred to Acrophyseter but has not been given a species designation. A. robustus had a more pointed snout, straighter teeth, a decreasing width of the mandible from front to back, a groove on the side of its snout, and a more well-defined supracranial basin which housed the melon organ than A. deinodon.

The genus name Acrophyseter is derived from the Greek –meaning acute, which describes the short, pointed, upturned snout–and –which is the genus name for the modern sperm whale Physeter macrocephalus. The species name deinodon is from the Greek –meaning terrible–and –tooth.

Description
 
The body length range of Acrophyseter lies within . A. deinodon was estimated to be  using the distance between the cheek bones in comparison to the dimensions of Zygophyseter, which is relatively small, being the smallest of the raptorial sperm whales.

Unlike the modern sperm whales, A. deinodon had teeth on both its upper and lower jaws. The teeth were robust and deeply set into the roots, particularly the front teeth, the tooth roots were comparatively thick with the thin tooth crown. The front teeth were more conical than the back teeth. The lower back teeth were close together, and the space between the teeth increased from front to back, suggesting they were used for shearing, unlike the suction-feeding modern-day sperm whales which lack teeth in their upper jaws. The front teeth were more worn on the sides, whereas the bottom teeth were more worn along the middle. It had 12 teeth in the upper jaw and 13 teeth in the bottom jaw, and like other raptorials, it had tooth enamel. The premaxillae bore three teeth, and the maxillae had nine teeth. The last bottom teeth may have contacted the roof of the mouth. Discovered along the teeth sockets was buccal exostoses, bony growths, which may have developed during biting to strengthen the teeth, acting as buttresses. The back teeth had larger buccal exostoses as they experienced more pressure during biting. The tooth count of A. robustus is unknown though thought to be similar or the same. Cementum was continually added to the teeth as they were growing, as in killer whales (Orcinus orca).

 
Like other sperm whales, Acrophyseter had a deep basin on the top of its skull, the supracranial basin. This basin in Acrophyseter overhung the orbit around the eye, but did not extend onto the snout, unlike in other raptorials. Unlike later species of sperm whales, Acrophyseter had two nostrils. The temporal fossae on the sides of the skull were as high as they were long, unlike in Zygophyseter and Brygmophyseter, which displaced the brow ridge. The area between the condyloid process, which connects the jaw with the skull, and the teeth was probably where the masseter muscles were. The brow ridge slopes down at an angle of around 55°. The nuchal crest on the back side of the skull had overhung the supracranial basin. The cheekbones were thin plates which limited the ear canals. The snout was short and, unlike in other sperm whales, had a distinct upward curve. Unlike other sperm whales, the top of the premaxillae near the vomer lacked a deep groove.

Paleoecology
The short and pointed snout, coupled with the robust, curved front teeth suggests Acrophyseter targeted large prey and perhaps used their back teeth for shearing. The Sud-Sacaco locality of the Pisco Formation has yielded several marine vertebrates, which the Acrophyseter may have preyed upon: the whale Piscolithax, the whale Piscobalaena, the seal Acrophoca, the penguin Spheniscus urbinai, the marine sloth Thalassocnus natans, the crocodile Piscogavialis, megalodon, and the broad-toothed mako shark (Cosmopolitodus hastalis). The Cerro La Bruja locality has borne the dolphin Brachydelphis, the dolphin Atocetus iquensis, the kentriodontid dolphin Belonodelphis, an unspecified beaked whale, unspecified baleen whales, an unspecified monk seal, the penguin Spheniscus muizoni, megalodon, the broad-toothed mako shark, and a species of Carcharhinus shark.

TaxonomyAcrophyseter, together with Brygmophyseter, Livyatan, and Zygophyseter, belong to a group of macroraptorial sperm whales, which have adaptations to hunting large prey. They all have large, deeply rooted teeth coated in enamel in both the upper and lower jaws, unlike the modern sperm whale (Physeter macrocephalus) which lacks enamel and teeth in the upper jaw. Raptorials are thought to have either evolved these adaptations from a basilosaurid-like ancestor or independently once or twice within the group. The extinct subfamily Hoplocetinae has been proposed to house this group, alongside the genera Scaldicetus, Diaphorocetus, Idiorophus, and Hoplocetus''. This subfamily is paraphyletic, in that it does not consist of a common ancestor and all of its descendants.

References

Sperm whales
Prehistoric toothed whales
Prehistoric cetacean genera
Miocene cetaceans
Miocene mammals of South America
Neogene Peru
Fossils of Peru
Pisco Formation
Fossil taxa described in 2008